Live at Copenhagen Jazz House (also referred to as just Live) is a live album by keyboardist and composer Stanley Cowell recorded in Denmark in 1993 and first released on the Danish SteepleChase label in 1995.

Reception

AllMusic said the album was "Highly recommended".

Track listing
All compositions by Stanley Cowell except where noted.
 "Anthropology" (Dizzy Gillespie, Charlie Parker) – 7:56		
 "Bright Passion" – 5:46		
 "Brilliant Circles" – 8:10		
 "Stella by Starlight" (Ned Washington, Victor Young) – 11:57		
 "Prayer for Peace" – 11:08		
 "It Don't Mean a Thing (If It Ain't Got That Swing)" (Duke Ellington, Irving Mills) – 6:07
 "Autumn Leaves" (Joseph Kosma, Johnny Mercer, Jacques Prévert) – 7:21
 "In Walked Bud" (Thelonious Monk) – 5:11

Personnel
Stanley Cowell – piano
Cheyney Thomas – bass
Wardell Thomas – drums

References

1995 live albums
Stanley Cowell live albums
SteepleChase Records live albums
Albums recorded at Jazzhus Montmartre